Evan Mariano (born January 20, 1988) is a Belizean professional footballer who currently plays for Police United and the Belize national football team as a striker.

External links
 Career summary at FIFA.com

1988 births
Living people
Belize international footballers
Belizean footballers
Premier League of Belize players
2011 Copa Centroamericana players
2013 Copa Centroamericana players
2013 CONCACAF Gold Cup players
2014 Copa Centroamericana players

Association football forwards
Police United FC (Belize) players
Belize Defence Force FC players
Beach soccer players